Maurice Paige (born 1983), is a South African actor and bodybuilder. He is best known for his roles in the popular serials Gog' Helen, Die Spreeus and Pop, Lock 'n Roll.

Career
He started his career with several stage productions. In 2009, he joined the cast of popular soapie Isidingo which was aired on SABC 1. In the TV serial, he played the cheeky and ambitious Coloured guy from the Cape 'Calvin Xavier'. He appeared in the Afrikaans soap opera Suidooster which was aired on kykNet in 2017. Meanwhile, he took part in the seasons 7 of Seychelles Adventure competition, 'Tropika Island of Treasure', with feisty partner Michelle Allen. They came third in the competition. He then starred in the serial Pop, Lock ‘n Roll where he played the role 'Raps McKeiser'.

Apart from acting, he is also a bodybuilder. He won several medals at competitive events, including the South African section of Muscle Mulisha Grand Prix bodybuilding competition and the annual Arnold Classic Europe, a body building contest held in Barcelona. In 2020 he started to play in the TV serial Suidooster where he acts the role of 'Tyron'.

Filmography

References

External links
 

1983 births
Living people
South African male television actors
South African male film actors